Edin Ibrahimovic (born 11 July 1998) is an Austrian volleyball player, a member of the club Menlo College.

Sporting achievements

Clubs 
MEVZA:
  2018
Austrian Championship:
  2018

References

External links
 VCA profile
 Volleybox profile
 CEV profile

1998 births
People from Brčko District
Living people
Austria men's volleyball players
Austrian people of Bosnia and Herzegovina descent